Mercan is a municipality (belde) in the Tercan District, Erzincan Province, Turkey. It had a population of 2,077 in 2021.

The neighborhoods are Akşemsettin, Atatürk and Fatih.

References 

Populated places in Erzincan Province
Towns in Turkey